Kobuk may refer to:

 Kobuk, Alaska
 Kobuk River, in Alaska
 Kobuk Valley National Park in Alaska